The High Court of Justice in Ireland was the court created by the Supreme Court of Judicature Act (Ireland) 1877 to replace the existing court structure in Ireland. Its creation mirrored the reform of the courts of England and Wales five years earlier under the Judicature Acts. The Act created a Supreme Court of Judicature, consisting of a High Court of Justice and a Court of Appeal.

Establishment 
The High Court was created by the  Supreme Court of Judicature (Ireland) Act 1877,  through the amalgamation of a number of courts.  Most importantly, the three superior common-law courts (the Court of King's Bench, the Court of Common Pleas, and the Court of Exchequer) and the Court of Chancery were merged into the new court.  Also merged into it were the courts of Landed Estates, Probate, Matrimonial Causes, Admiralty, and Bankruptcy.  However, the right of appeal from Ireland to the House of Lords in England was preserved.

An important consequence of the amalgamation of the superior common-law courts with the court of equity (Chancery) was that, for the first time, the previously separate systems of common law and equity were merged.

The structure of the abolished courts was reflected in the divisions created for the new High Court. These  proved to be unnecessarily complex, and the opportunity presented by the death, retirement, and transfer of a number of the judges was taken in order to simplify the organisation of the divisions, so that by 1897 there were only two: Chancery, and the Queen's Bench.

Of the existing office holders, the Lord Chancellor of Ireland presided in the new Court of Appeal. The Master of the Rolls in Ireland and the Vice-Chancellor moved to the Chancery Division; the latter office was abolished in 1904. The Chief Justice of the Irish Common Pleas retained his rank until 1887 when the incumbent became Lord Chief Justice of Ireland. Christopher Palles, the last Chief Baron of the Irish Exchequer remained in office until 1916, acting as a judge both of the King's Bench Division and of the Court of Appeal.

Partition 

The Government of Ireland Act 1920 abolished the Supreme Court of Judicature created by the 1877 Act. It split the High Court into separate courts for Northern and Southern Ireland; judges of the former court became judges in Southern Ireland unless they chose otherwise. The Court of Appeal was also split into separate courts with a new overarching High Court of Appeal for Ireland; the latter court sat on a few occasions but was abolished in 1922 in consequence of the establishment of the Irish Free State.

Subsequent developments
Following the establishment of the Irish Free State in December 1922, the High Court of Justice in Southern Ireland (now the High Court of the Irish Free State) remained in existence for two years, in accordance with the "carry-over" provisions in Article 75 of the Constitution of the Irish Free State. It was abolished by the Courts of Justice Act 1924, which replaced it with a new High Court. With only two exceptions, the judges of the old High Court were retired on a generous pension.

In Northern Ireland a new Supreme Court of Judicature was created in 1978, although the basic court structure remained largely unchanged.

References

High Court of Justice
Courts and tribunals established in 1877
1877 establishments in Ireland
1924 disestablishments in Ireland
Courts and tribunals disestablished in 1924